'Dayo Adedayo (born 1 July 1964) is a British-trained Nigerian documentary photographer, cultural anthropologist, and author. Dayo is the author of Nigeria 2.0, the book documents the story behind many important places in Nigeria. Within a space of 17 years, 'Dayo has travelled and documented 36 states in Nigeria.

Education 
Adedayo had his primary education at Children's Home School, Molete, Ibadan, Oyo State, Nigeria and Moslem Primary School, Idofe, Oke-Ife, Ijebu Ife, Ogun State, Nigeria. He passed his secondary school certificate at Ijebu Ife Community Grammar School. He studied Photography Arts at Westminster College and University of Westminster, U.K. He is the author of Rivers State Our Proud Heritage, Tour Nigeria, and Lagos State, A Visual Portrait. He has archived over 4 million images on Nigeria.

Career 
Adedayo started out as a social photographer, later freelancer for Ovation Magazine International before venturing into documentary photography. He has travelled and visually documented all 774 local government areas in Nigeria, capturing landscapes, people, culture, flora, and food. His photographic works are watermarked on the pages of the Nigerian e-Passport, adorn the walls of the Lagos and Abuja international airports and decorate the walls of numerous public institutions both in Nigeria and in the diaspora. In 2014, to commemorate Nigeria's nationhood, he was commissioned to produce images for the centenary One hundred Naira note. He was a member of a committee saddled with the responsibility of setting up photography in the pilot project curriculum for the National Board for Technical Education (NBTE), the regulatory body for Nigerian Polytechnics.

Publications 
He is the author of fourteen books including; Nigeria, Nigeria 2.0, Enchanting Nigeria, Nigeria The Magical, Lagos State - The Centre of Excellence, Ogun State - The Gateway State, Owe Yoruba, Nigerian Tourism Development Corporation - Tourism is Life, Nigerian National Petroleum Corporation 37 Years in Pictures, Rivers State - Our Proud Heritage, Tour Nigeria, Lagos State - A visual Portrait, Owe Yoruba 2.0 and Ogun State - A Visual Portrait.

References

Living people
Nigerian photographers
Yoruba photographers
Nigerian editors
Nigerian travel writers
1964 births
Alumni of the University of Westminster